Mette Jokumsen (born 11 February 1977) is a Danish retired midfielder who played for IK Skovbakken and the Danish national team.

International career
Jokumsen was also part of the Danish team at the 2001 European Championships.

References

1977 births

Living people
Denmark women's international footballers
Danish women's footballers
VSK Aarhus (women) players
Women's association football forwards